The Swan Island Industrial Park is an industrial park on Swan Island in Portland, Oregon, United States. The industrial park comprises  and is operated by the Port of Portland.

History
During World War II, Swan Island was the site of the Kaiser Company's Swan Island Shipyard. Kaiser's dry dock and ship repair facilities were acquired by the Port of Portland in 1948. Prior to World War II, Swan Island was the location of the Swan Island Airport, and there had been some dispute about whether Swan Island should continue to be used as an industrial area or re-appropriated for aviation purposes. Oregon voters approved an $84 million bond to expand the shipyard in the late 1970s. The Port of Portland sold the facilities to shipbuilder Cascade General in 2000 at a cost of $30.8 million.

Description
More than 200 businesses are located at the Swan Island industrial area. As of 2008, more than 10,000 people were employed at the site.

Shipbuilder Vigor Industrial is headquartered at Swan Island, where it operates a  shipyard with three dry docks. Swan Island is also the headquarters of Daimler Trucks North America. FedEx and UPS have packaging and distribution centers at the Swan Island area.

Residents of nearby neighborhoods have complained of odors coming from the industrial facilities on Swan Island.

References

External links

Buildings and structures in Portland, Oregon
Economy of Portland, Oregon
Industrial buildings and structures in Oregon
Industrial parks in the United States
Overlook, Portland, Oregon
Port of Portland (Oregon)